Tumult may refer to:
 Violent and noisy commotion or disturbance of a crowd
 A general outbreak or disorder, riot

Other uses
Tumult Records, an independent record label based in San Francisco
Tumult (album), an album by Dutch punk rock band The Ex
Tumult, the twelfth song from Stone Sour (album)
HMS Tumult, the name of two ships of the Royal Navy

See also
Tumultuous (disambiguation)